The Spantik-Sosbun Mountains are a sub range of the Karakoram range in Gilgit-Baltistan, Pakistan.

Geography 
The highest peak is Spantik, .
The other namesake peak is Sosbun Brakk, .

On the north, the range is bounded by the important Hispar and Biafo Glaciers, across which lie the Hispar Muztagh and Panmah Muztagh respectively. On the southwest, the Barpu Glacier and the longer Chogo Lungma Glacier separate the range from the Rakaposhi-Haramosh Mountains; the pass known as the Polan La, separates the Barpu from the Chogo Lungma, and links the two ranges. On the southeast, the Braldu River separates the range from the somewhat lower Mango Gusor Mountains.

See also
Mountain ranges of Pakistan

References

Mountain ranges of Gilgit-Baltistan
Mountain ranges of the Karakoram